"Chill" is a song by the Finnish rock band The Rasmus, originally released on the band's fourth album Into on October 29, 2001

The single was released on June 18, 2001 by the record label Playground Music. It was the second single from the album Into and features the tracks "Chill" and "F-F-F-Falling" (Acoustic). The maxi single also includes the b-side "Can't Stop Me" and the music video to "F-F-F-Falling".  It was a number two hit in Finland.

"Chill" is a slow and melodic song, like many others on the album Into.

Single track listing
CD-single
 "Chill" - 4:14
 "F-F-F-Falling" (Acoustic) - 3:28

Maxi single
 "Chill" - 4:14
 "F-F-F-Falling" (Acoustic) - 3:28
 "Can't Stop Me" - 2:53
 "F-F-F-Falling" music video

Music video
The music video for "Chill" was shot by the band themselves on a tour in Stockholm, Sweden the same year. The video shows different clips of the band on stage and also on their tour bus.

Band's Comments
Eero:"It's a slow and peaceful song. It was easy to make. Pauli had the guitar melody for the chorus and the verses."

External links
 The Rasmus' official website
 "Chill" music video on YouTube
 Lyrics of this song - Chill

The Rasmus songs
2001 singles
Songs written by Lauri Ylönen
Playground Music Scandinavia singles
2001 songs